The Sylvania Sandstone is a geologic formation in Ohio and Michigan. Its type locality is Sylvania, Ohio. It preserves fossils dating back to the Devonian period.

See also

 List of fossiliferous stratigraphic units in Ohio

References
 

Devonian Ohio
Devonian Michigan
Middle Devonian Series